McGaffey is an unincorporated community and census-designated place (CDP) in McKinley County, New Mexico, United States. It was first listed as a CDP prior to the 2020 census.

The community is in the southern part of the county, at the south end of New Mexico State Road 400, which leads north  to Interstate 40 near Fort Wingate. McGaffey is within Cibola National Forest, and the Forest Service's McGaffey Campground is just south of the center of the community.

Demographics

Education
It is in Gallup-McKinley County Public Schools.

References 

Census-designated places in McKinley County, New Mexico
Census-designated places in New Mexico